Virgin Comics is a comic book publisher.

Virgin divide their output into a number of different lines which focus on topics derived from Indian mythology (Shakti), work with film directors (Director's Cut) and with other notable individuals (Virgin Voices).

Lines

Director's Cut
Dock Walloper (Edward Burns project)
Guy Ritchie's Gamekeeper (Guy Ritchie project)
The Megas (Jonathan Mostow project)
Seven Brothers (John Woo project)
Snake Woman (Shekhar Kapur project)

Shakti
Devi
The Sadhu
Ramayan 3392 A.D.
India Authentic
The Tall Tales of Vishnu Sharma
The Asura Analogues
The Master Blaster
Project Kalki
Beyond
Blade of the Warrior: Kshatriya
Buddha
Priyanka Chopra comic
Mumbai Macguffin
Jimmy Zhingchak - Agent of D.I.S.C.O.

Virgin Voices
Walk-In (David A. Stewart project)
Voodoo Child (Nicolas Cage project)
The Stranded (joint venture with the Sci Fi Channel)
Masked Magician (based on the character from Breaking the Magician's Code)
Shadow Hunter (Jenna Jameson project)
Zombie Broadway  (David A. Stewart project)
Nowhere Man (Hugh Jackman project)

Other
 Dan Dare

Notes

References

Virgin Comics